Zapater's ringlet (Erebia zapateri) is a member of the subfamily Satyrinae of the family Nymphalidae. It is found only in the Montes Universales mountain range in central Spain at more than 1,300 m above sea level in open forests.

References

Erebia
Butterflies described in 1875
Butterflies of Europe
Taxa named by Charles Oberthür